Thomas Paul (14 May 1933 – 2015) was an English professional footballer who played as a winger.

References

1933 births
2015 deaths
Footballers from Grimsby
English footballers
Association football wingers
Immingham St Andrew's F.C. players
Grimsby Town F.C. players
English Football League players